The 2009–10 FC Shakhtar Donetsk season saw the club win their fifth Ukrainian Premier League. After winning the 2009 UEFA Cup, Shakhtar competed in the UEFA Super Cup for the first time, losing 1–0 to Barcelona after extra time. Shakhtar started the season in the UEFA Champions League as a result of winning the 2008–09 Premier League, but were knocked out at the third qualifying round by Poli Timișoara, resulting in them playing in the UEFA Europa League. Shakhtar managed to reach the round of 32 before falling to Fulham, while in the Ukrainian Cup they reached the semi-finals before falling to Metalurh Donetsk.

Squad

Transfers

In

Out

Loans out

Competitions

Overall

UEFA Super Cup

Premier League

League table

Results summary

Results by round

Results

Ukrainian Cup

UEFA Champions League

Qualifying phase

UEFA Europa League

Play-off round

Group stage

Knockout phase

Squad statistics

Appearances and goals

|-
|colspan="14"|Players away from Shakhtar Donetsk on loan:

|-
|colspan="14"|Players that left Shakhtar Donetsk during the season:

|}

Goal scorers

Clean sheets

Disciplinary record

References 

FC Shakhtar Donetsk seasons
Shakhtar Donetsk
Ukrainian football championship-winning seasons